Borzard (means yellow hill and named due to a yellow hill which is located in the entrance of this village), is a village in Rahdar Rural District, in the Central District of Rudan County, Hormozgan Province, Iran. At the 2006 census, its population was 46, in 12 families.

References 

Populated places in Rudan County